The Modèle 1952 34mm HE rifle grenade was in French service from 1952 to 1978. It was used alongside the APAV40 rifle grenade in French service. It was propelled by being mounted atop a rifle's 22 mm grenade launching adapter, and being launched by a ballistite (blank) cartridge.

In common with other rifle grenades of this era, they became obsolescent when the bullet trap form of propulsion became popular at the end of the 1970s.

The Yugoslavian M60 anti-personnel grenade, similarly launched from a rifle's 22 mm grenade launching adapter by a ballistite cartridge, bears a strong resemblance.

Sources and references

French army manual on rifle grenades dated 1966 with an illustration of the Modèle 1952 and text on pages 21 to 22

External links
Photos and cutaway images of the M52 rifle grenade (as used with the MAS 36)
A French navy commando armed with rifle grenades aboard a helicopter in Algeria
Article (in Spanish) with reference to several French rifle grenades

Cold War weapons of France
Rifle grenades
Military equipment introduced in the 1950s